The King's Cup air race is a British handicapped cross-country event, which has taken place annually since 1922. It is run by the Royal Aero Club Records Racing and Rally Association.

The King's Cup is one of the most prestigious prizes of the British air racing season. The entrants are divided into classes, and each is evaluated and given a time handicap for the start of the race. They all take off at varying times according to their handicap, with the handicappers' aim being that they should all cross the finishing line at the same moment. The art of winning the race outright is therefore to beat the handicappers, rather than to make the fastest flight as such. The aircraft are also divided into classes, with a winner for each class as well as the outright winner.

History 

The King's Cup air race was established by King George V as an incentive to the development of light aircraft and engine design. Initially, it was open to Commonwealth pilots only.

The first King's Cup air race took place on 8 September 1922. It covered a distance of 810 miles from Croydon Aerodrome, south of London, to Glasgow, Scotland and back again after an overnight stop. The winner of this first race was Frank L. Barnard, chief pilot of the Instone Air Line, in a passenger-carrying Airco DH.4A.

The 1939 race was cancelled due to the outbreak of World War II, and the contest did not resume until 1949. The 1951 race was abandoned due to bad weather. In 1953, there was a fatal mid-air collision at the King's Cup Air Race meeting at Southend Airport, in which John Crowther, a hotelier from the Marine Hotel, Tankerton, Kent, was killed.

In 1961, for the first time, aircraft designed outside Great Britain and the Commonwealth of Nations were allowed to enter, after the 1960 race was won by a French designed but British built Druine Turbulent. Aircraft all-up-weight was limited to 12,500 lb, and the aircraft required to be British registered.

Along with the former Schneider Trophy, and the current British Air Racing Championship, the King's Cup is one of the most sought-after prizes of the air racing season.

Races and winners 

Source: Royal Aero Club, except where noted.

Notes

References
 Berliner, Don. "A Concise History of Air Racing". Society of Air Racing Historians. 6 March 2013. (retrieved 4 May 2022).
Lewis, Peter. British Racing and Record-Breaking Aircraft. London:Putnam, 1971.   
Tegler, John. International 1971 Air Racing Annual''. USARA.

External links
 Royal Aero Club Records Racing and Rally Association
 Pathe News Reel of the 1957 Air Race Included is footage of winner F. Dunkerley.

Air races